Johan Hendrik "Hans" Grosheide (6 August 1930 – 18 December 2022) was a Dutch politician of the defunct Anti-Revolutionary Party (ARP) and later the Christian Democratic Appeal (CDA) party and jurist.

Biography

Grosheide attended a Gymnasium in Amsterdam from April 1943 until May 1949 and applied at the Free University Amsterdam in June 1949 majoring in Law and obtaining an Bachelor of Laws degree in July 1951 before graduating with a Master of Laws degree in April 1954. Grosheide worked as a teacher and education administrator for Protestant Reformed special schools from November 1954 until September 1963. Grosheide served on the Anti-Revolutionary Party Executive Board from February 1958 until September 1963.

After the election of 1963 Grosheide was appointed State Secretary for Education, Arts and Sciences in the Cabinet Marijnen, taking office on 3 September 1963. The Cabinet Marijnen fell on 27 February 1965 after a disagreement in the coalition about reforms to the public broadcasting system and continued to serve in a demissionary capacity until the cabinet formation of 1965 when it was replaced by the Cabinet Cals on 14 April 1965 with Grosheide continuing as State Secretary for Education and Sciences, taking office on 14 April 1965. The Cabinet Cals fell on 14 October 1966 after the Leader of the Catholic People's Party Norbert Schmelzer had proposed a motion that called for a stronger austerity policy to further reduce the deficit was seen as an indirect motion of no confidence and continued to serve in a demissionary capacity until the cabinet formation of 1966 when it was replaced by the caretaker Cabinet Zijlstra with Grosheide continuing as State Secretary for Education and Sciences, taking office on 22 November 1966. After the election of 1967 Grosheide remained State Secretary for Education and Sciences in the Cabinet De Jong, taking office on 5 April 1967. Grosheide was elected as a Member of the House of Representatives after the election of 1971, taking office on 11 May 1971. Following the cabinet formation of 1971 Grosheide was appointed State Secretary for Justice in the Cabinet Biesheuvel I, taking office on 28 July 1971. The Cabinet Biesheuvel I fell just one year later on 19 July 1972 after the Democratic Socialists '70 (DS'70) retracted their support following their dissatisfaction with the proposed budget memorandum to further reduce the deficit and continued to serve in a demissionary capacity until the first cabinet formation of 1972 when it was replaced by the caretaker Cabinet Biesheuvel II with Grosheide continuing as State Secretary for Justice, taking office on 9 August 1972. In August 1972 Grosheide announced that he wouldn't stand for the election of 1972. The Cabinet Biesheuvel II was replaced by the Cabinet Den Uyl following the cabinet formation of 1973 on 11 May 1973.

Grosheide remained active in national politics, in January 1974 he was nominated as Mayor of Rijswijk, taking office on 1 February 1974. Grosheide also worked as the director of the Abraham Kuyper Foundation from 1 July 1974 until 1 August 1979 and served again on the Anti-Revolutionary Party Executive Board from August 1974 until October 1980. In June 1978 Grosheide was appointed Director-General of the Custodial Institutions Agency of the Ministry of Justice, he resigned as Mayor the same day he was installed as Director-General on 1 July 1978. Grosheide was appointed Special Coordinator for European Immigration an Asylum and Deputy Secretary-General of the Ministry of Justice on 1 January 1991. In January 1993 Grosheide was nominated as Extraordinary Member of the Council of State, he resigned as a Special Coordinator the day he was installed as a Member of the Council of State, serving from 1 February 1993 until 1 September 2000.

Grosheide was known for his abilities as a manager and policy wonk.

Grosheide died on 18 December 2022, at the age of 92.

Decorations

References

External links

  Mr. J.H. (Hans) Grosheide Parlement & Politiek

 

1930 births
2022 deaths
Anti-Revolutionary Party politicians
Christian Democratic Appeal politicians
Commanders of the Order of the Netherlands Lion
Dutch corporate directors
Dutch magazine editors
Dutch nonprofit directors
Dutch school administrators
Grand Officers of the Order of Orange-Nassau
Knights of the Holy Sepulchre
Mayors in South Holland
People from Rijswijk
Members of the Council of State (Netherlands)
Members of the House of Representatives (Netherlands)
Politicians from Amsterdam
Protestant Church Christians from the Netherlands
Reformed Churches Christians from the Netherlands
State Secretaries for Education of the Netherlands
State Secretaries for Justice of the Netherlands
Vrije Universiteit Amsterdam alumni
Writers from Amsterdam
20th-century Dutch civil servants
20th-century Dutch educators
20th-century Dutch jurists
20th-century Dutch male writers
20th-century Dutch politicians
21st-century Dutch civil servants
21st-century Dutch jurists
21st-century Dutch male writers